Van Atta or Vanatta is a surname of Dutch origin. Notable people with the surname include:

Bob Vanatta (1918-2016), American basketball coach
Dale Van Atta (born 1951), American journalist and writer
Lee Van Atta (1922–2002), American child actor
Russ Van Atta (1906–1986), American baseball player

Other
Van Atta High, American musical group
Vanatta, Ohio
Vanatta Apartments, historic building in Craig, Colorado

See also
Van Etten
Van Natta

Surnames of Dutch origin